The Lomena is a river in Lithuania, a left tributary of the Neris.  It starts in Vladikiškės, Kaišiadorys District Municipality and ends in Tartokas, Jonava District Municipality, Lithuania. 

The Lomena passes through  Stasiūnai, Gudiena, Kaišiadorys, Palomenė, Bagdoniškės, Lomeniai, Tartokas settlements. The river's lower course is protected by the Lomena Landscape Sanctuary.

The hydronym Lomena derives from Lithuanian word loma ('trough, depression, valley') although its older attested form, written in Polish as Łowmiana could suggest that it may derive from the word laumė ('a mythical being').

References

Rivers of Lithuania
Jonava District Municipality
Kaišiadorys District Municipality